was an Imperial Japanese Army intelligence officer who fought in World War II and was a Japanese holdout who did not surrender at the war's end in August 1945. After the war ended, Onoda spent 29 years hiding in the Philippines until his former commander travelled from Japan to formally relieve him from duty by order of Emperor Shōwa in 1974. He held the rank of second lieutenant in the Imperial Japanese Army. One of the last remaining and most famous Japanese holdouts, Onoda was the  last Japanese soldier to surrender.

Early life 
Onoda was born on 19 March 1922, in Kamekawa Village, Kaisō District, Wakayama Prefecture, Japan. When he was 17 years old, he went to work for the Tajima Yoko trading company in Wuhan, China. When he was 18, he enlisted in the Imperial Japanese Army Infantry.

Military service 

On 26 December 1944, he was sent to Lubang Island in the Philippines. He was ordered to do all he could to hamper enemy attacks on the island, including destroying the airstrip and the pier at the harbor. Onoda's orders also stated that under no circumstances was he to surrender or take his own life.

When he landed on the island, Onoda joined forces with a group of Japanese soldiers who had been sent there previously. The officers in the group outranked Onoda and prevented him from carrying out his assignment, which made it easier for the United States and Philippine Commonwealth forces to take the island when they landed on 28 February 1945. Within a short time of the landing, all but Onoda and three other soldiers had either died or surrendered. Onoda, who had been promoted to lieutenant, ordered the men to take to the hills.

Time in hiding 

Onoda continued his campaign as a Japanese holdout, initially living in the mountains of Lubang Island in the Philippines, with three fellow soldiers (Private Yuichi Akatsu, Corporal Shōichi Shimada and Private First Class Kinshichi Kozuka). During his stay, Onoda and his companions carried out guerrilla activities and engaged in several shootouts with the local police.

The first time they saw a leaflet announcing that Japan had surrendered was in October 1945; another cell had killed a cow and found a leaflet left behind by islanders which read: "The war ended on 15 August. Come down from the mountains!" However, they distrusted the leaflet. They concluded that it was Allied propaganda and also believed that they would not have been fired on if the war had indeed been over. Toward the end of 1945, leaflets were dropped by air with a surrender order printed on them from General Tomoyuki Yamashita of the Fourteenth Area Army. To the men who had been in hiding for over six months, this leaflet was the only evidence they had that the war was over. Onoda's group studied the leaflet closely to determine whether it was genuine, and decided it was not.

One of the four soldiers, Yuichi Akatsu, walked away from the others in September 1949 and surrendered to Philippine forces in March 1950, after six months on his own. This seemed like a security problem to the others and they became even more cautious. In 1952, letters and family pictures were dropped from an aircraft urging them to surrender, but the three soldiers concluded that this was a trick. Shimada was shot in the leg during a shoot-out with local fishermen in June 1953, after which Onoda nursed him back to health. On 7 May 1954, Shimada was killed by a shot fired by a search party looking for the men. Kozuka was killed by two shots fired by local police on 19 October 1972 while he and Onoda, as part of their guerrilla activities, were burning rice that had been collected by farmers. Onoda was now alone.

On 20 February 1974, Onoda met a Japanese man, Norio Suzuki, who was traveling around the world, looking for "Lieutenant Onoda, a panda, and the Abominable Snowman, in that order". Suzuki found Onoda after four days of searching. Onoda described this moment in a 2010 interview: "This hippie boy Suzuki came to the island to listen to the feelings of a Japanese soldier. Suzuki asked me why I would not come out...". Onoda and Suzuki became friends, but Onoda still refused to surrender, saying that he was waiting for orders from a superior officer. Suzuki returned to Japan with photographs of himself and Onoda as proof of their encounter, and the Japanese government located Onoda's commanding officer, Major Yoshimi Taniguchi, who had long surrendered and since become a bookseller. Taniguchi went to Lubang Island, and on 9 March 1974, he finally met with Onoda and fulfilled a promise he had made back in 1944: "Whatever happens, we'll come back for you". Taniguchi then issued Onoda the following orders:

Onoda was thus properly relieved of duty, and he surrendered. He turned over his sword, a functioning Arisaka Type 99 rifle, 500 rounds of ammunition and several hand grenades, as well as the dagger his mother had given him in 1944 to kill himself with if he was captured. Only Private Teruo Nakamura, arrested on 18 December 1974 in Indonesia, held out longer.

Later life 
Onoda was very popular following his return to Japan and some people urged him to run for the Diet (Japan's bicameral legislature). He also released an autobiography, No Surrender: My Thirty-Year War, shortly after his return, detailing his life as a guerrilla fighter in a war that was long over. A Philippine documentary interviewed people who lived on Lubang Island during Onoda's stay, revealing that Onoda had killed several people, which he had not mentioned in his autobiography. The news media reported this and other misgivings, but at the same time welcomed his return home. The Japanese government offered him a large sum of money in back pay, which he refused. When money was pressed on him by well-wishers, he donated it to Yasukuni Shrine.

Onoda was reportedly unhappy being the subject of receiving much attention and troubled by what he saw as the withering of traditional Japanese values. In April 1975, he followed the example of his elder brother Tadao and left Japan for Brazil, where he raised cattle. He married in 1976 and assumed a leading role in the Colônia Jamic (Jamic Colony), a Japanese community in Terenos, Mato Grosso do Sul, Brazil. Onoda also allowed the Brazilian Air Force to conduct training sessions on the land that he owned. After reading about a Japanese teenager who had murdered his parents in 1980, Onoda returned to Japan in 1984 and established the Onoda Shizen Juku ("Onoda Nature School") educational camp for young people, held at various locations in Japan.

President of the Philippines Ferdinand Marcos granted him a full pardon for his actions against local residents in a televised ceremony. As a result, controversy followed when Onoda revisited Lubang Island in 1996, because his wife Machie Onoda (née Honoku) had arranged a US$10,000 scholarship donation on his behalf to the local school there. In 2006, Machie Onoda became the head of the conservative Japan Women's Association (JWA), established by the conservative group Nippon Kaigi in September 2001.

For many years, Onoda spent three months of the year in Brazil. Onoda was awarded the Merit medal of Santos-Dumont by the Brazilian Air Force on 6 December 2004. On 21 February 2010, the Legislative Assembly of Mato Grosso do Sul awarded him the title of Cidadão ("Citizen").

Death 
Onoda died of heart failure on 16 January 2014, at St. Luke's International Hospital in Tokyo, from complications due to pneumonia. Japanese Chief Cabinet Secretary, and later Prime Minister, Yoshihide Suga, commented on his death: "I still vividly remember that I was reassured of the end of the war when Mr. Onoda returned to Japan" and also praised his will to survive.

In popular culture

Books 
 わがルバン島の30年戦争 [30 Years War on the Island of Lubang]. Tokyo: 講談社 [Tokyo Kōdansha], 1974. . 248 pages.
 No Surrender: My Thirty-Year War. Translated by Charles S. Terry. New York: Dell Publishing, 1974. , . 251 pages.

Interviews 
 Hiroo Onoda describes his private thirty years of war against the United States. Broadcast on The Mike Douglas Show, February 14, 1975.

Film 
 The Last Flight of Noah's Ark (1980) is an American family adventure film where civilians meet two elderly Japanese holdout sailors who have lived alone on an uncharted island for 35 years.
 Who Finds a Friend Finds a Treasure (1981), an italian adventure-comedy movie with Terence Hill, Bud Spencer and John Fujioka
 Onoda's War (2016), independent short film
 Holdout (2016), independent short film
 The Last Imperial Soldier (2018) is a short fictionalized account inspired by the life of Onoda.
 Onoda: 10,000 Nights in the Jungle (2021)

Television
 Gilligan's Island episode "So Sorry, My Island Now" (S1 Ep15) centered around the character of "Japanese Sailor" who, arriving on the island in a mini-sub, thinks it's still WWII and holds the castaways prisoner on their own island.

 The Six Million Dollar Man episode "The Last Kamikaze" (S2 Ep14) involved a search for a new type of atomic weapon lost on an island with a Japanese pilot who believed the war was still going on.

  Archer episode “The Holdout” (S6 Ep1) depicts a character Sato Kentaro, a hold out marooned on Borneo, who believes WWII is still underway and is convinced to assist Archer with his mission.

Music 
  The Nude album released in 1981 by English progressive rock band Camel is based on Hiroo Onoda's story.

See also 

 List of Japanese holdouts
 List of solved missing person cases
 Shoichi Yokoi, among the last three Japanese holdouts to be found after the war, he was discovered in the jungles of Guam in 1972
 Siege of Baler
 Survival skills
 Teruo Nakamura, the last known Japanese holdout to surrender, he was discovered in December 1974, Morotai Island, Indonesia

Footnotes

Works cited

Further reading 
 Robert D. McFadden, "Hiroo Onoda, Soldier Who Hid in Jungle for Decades, Dies at 91," New York Times, 17 January 2014.

External links 
 (also with Shoichi Yokoi).
.
 Onoda Shizen Juku 
Article and 5:57 minute video of a 2010 news broadcast showing interview with 88-year-old Onoda, his wife, color footage of when he left the jungle in 1974, etc. abc.net.au
Taylor, Alan. Image No. 45 (last at bottom): Photo of Onoda wearing his sword, on his last day before being relieved, with narrative caption, World War II: After the War, A Retrospective in 20 Parts. The Atlantic, 30 October 2011.
.
Hiroo Onoda obituary The Daily Telegraph.
 Hiroo Onoda fought WWII For 30 Additional Years (video)
 Hiroo Onoda (middle): The Imperial Japanese soldier who hid in the Philippine jungle for 30 years after WWII. March 11, 1974 (photo), Imgur.

1922 births
2014 deaths
Formerly missing people
Imperial Japanese Army officers
Japanese autobiographers
Japanese emigrants to Brazil
Japanese expatriates in the Philippines
Japanese holdouts
Imperial Japanese Army personnel of World War II
Members of Nippon Kaigi
Military history of the Philippines during World War II
Missing person cases in Japan
People from Wakayama Prefecture
Recipients of Philippine presidential pardons